Vsevolod Yanchevsky (Yanchevsky, Usievalad Yancheuski, born April 22, 1976) is a Belarusian political and public person. Director of Hi-Tech Park (since March 16, 2017).
Advisor of the President of the Republic of Belarus Alexander Lukashenko - Head of Ideology Department of the Administration of the President of the Republic of Belarus (April 18, 2008 – March 15, 2017).

Life and Politics

Vsevolod Yanchevsky was born on April 22, 1976 in Barysau, Minsk Region. In 1998 he graduated from the Law Faculty of the Belarusian State University majoring in Politics and Public Administration.

Political and public activity

In 1994, Yanchevsky took an active part in the election campaign in the Republic of Belarus, being a confidant of Alexander Lukashenko. In 1995 he was elected as a member of the election headquarters of Stanislau Shushkevich during the Belarusian Supreme Council election.

From 1996 to 1997, he was one of the leaders of youth organization "Priamoe deistvie" ("Direct action") created in support of Alexander Lukashenko. From 1997 to 2001, Vsevolod Yanchevsky worked as a first secretary of the Central Committee of the public association "Belarusian Patriotic Youth Union", pro-governmental organization that involved youth policy divisions of local government.

In the fall of 2000, Yanchevsky was elected as a member of the House of Representatives of the National Assembly of the Republic of Belarus of the 2nd convocation (at the age 24). He was a member of the Standing Committee of Education, Culture, Science and Technical Progress.  
Yanchevsky managed to convey his idea on reforming the state youth policy to Alexander Lukashenko. In 2002 the newly formed government-funded organization Belarusian Republican Youth Union was created.

From 2005 to 2007, Yanchevsky worked as a chief editor of the "Planeta" magazine.

Political career

In 2007 he was the First Deputy Head of Directorate General – the Head of Ideology Work Coordination Department of the Administration of the President of the Republic of Belarus.

On April 18, 2008 Yanchevsky was appointed Advisor on ideology to President Lukashenko and the Head of the State Ideology Department of the Administration of the President of the Republic of Belarus. 
He was the first is the Central Committee of the "Belarusian Patriotic Youth Union", who managed to get such a high position in the Administration of the President of the Republic of Belarus. 
By Decree No. 531 of December 2, 2013 the President of Belarus entrusted Yanchevsky with the functions of supervisor of "unified state policy in the areas of informatization, information and communication technologies, telecommunication and high techologies" and appointed him Chairman of the Supervisory Board of the Hi-Tech Park.

Vsevolod Yanchevsky is listed in the Top 50 most influential politicians in Belarus according to the "Nasha Niva".

In August 2016, shortly after the supersession of the military coup attempt in Turkey, he arrived in Ankara by the instruction of Alexander Lukashenko.

Hi-Tech Park

After his appointment as Director the exports of Hi-Tech Park Belarus significantly increased. It exceeded $1 billion with a growth rate of 125% for the first time in the history of the Park.  
According to UNCTAD, Belarus is a regional leader in IT production and exports per capita of total population. The exports of software in 2018 increased by 38% (up to US$1.4 billion).

In a short period of time, on the initiative of Yanchevsky the Presidential Degree No.8 "On the Development of Digital Economy" was developed and signed (signed on December 21, 2017, enforced on March 28, 2018).

After signing of the Decree the number of entry application from the IT companies extremely increased. 192 companies were residents of Hi-Tech Park by the end of 2017. In 2018 status of a Hi-Tech Park member became 268 companies. Thus, in just a year more companies entered the Park than in previous 12 years. Now Hi-Tech Park unites 751 member companies. 
The number of employees of Hi-Tech Park in 2017-2019 increased by more than 30 thousand people. Now it is more than 60 thousand developers. 
Hi-Tech Park attracts foreign business to Belarus. There are 91 R&D centers of foreign corporations in the Park including such well-known names as Mapbox (USA), SK Hynix (South Korea), IAC (USA), Playtika (Israel) and others.
The development of the ICT industry increased the recognition of Belarus in other countries. In 2019 more than 150 foreign delegations visited Hi-Tech Park.
After visiting Hi-Tech Park and meeting with Yanchevsky U.S. Secretary of State Michael Pompeo shared his impressions on his Twitter: "Inspired by what I saw at Hi-Tech Park Belarus. A great example of how Belarus can seize its extraordinary growth potential by embracing forward-looking economic policies and smart regulation. It's clear how impactful American investment can foster prosperity across the globe".

Hi-Tech Park makes a great contribution to the development of specialized education. HTP residents created 60 research and production laboratories and training centers on the basis of higher educational institutions, as well as 34 university departments.
More than 10 thousand children were trained and more than 800 teachers participated in the project "Programming - Second Literacy" in 2018–2019.

Honors and Achievements

•	Letter of Appreciation from the President of the Republic of Belarus
 
•	Order of Honor

Family

Married in 1998, has a daughter.

See also
 Presidential Administration of Belarus

References

Belarusian propagandists
Belarusian State University alumni
Belarusian media executives
Members of the National Assembly of Belarus
Presidential Administration of Belarus
1970 births
Living people